The Windmill Islands are an Antarctic group of rocky islands and rocks about  wide, paralleling the coast of Wilkes Land for  immediately north of Vanderford Glacier along the east side of Vincennes Bay.

The Windmill Islands were mapped from aerial photographs taken by USN Operation Highjump, 1946–47. So named by the US-ACAN because personnel of Operation Windmill, 1947–48, landed on Holl Island at the southwest end of the group to establish ground control for USN Operation Highjump photographs. The term "Operation Windmill" is a popular expression which developed after the expedition disbanded and refers to the extensive use of helicopters made by this group. The official title of this expedition was the 'Second Antarctic Development Project', U.S. Navy Task Force 39, 1947–48.

Features
Some of the main geographic features of the archipelago are:
 Austral Island
 Kilby Island
 Kirkby Shoal
 Larsen Bank
 McMullin Island
 Molholm Island
 Shirley Island

See also
 Composite Antarctic Gazetteer
 Harrigan Hill
 Holt Point
 List of Antarctic and sub-Antarctic islands
 List of Antarctic islands south of 60° S
 Newcomb Bay
 Nye Islands
 SCAR
 Territorial claims in Antarctica

References

External links

 
Islands of Wilkes Land